Emerald Lake is an alpine lake in Hinsdale County, Colorado, located in the Weminuche Wilderness of the San Juan National Forest near the Continental Divide. The Lake can be accessed by the Lake Fork trail #528. The lake is stocked with salmon.

See also 

 Weminuche Wilderness
 List of lakes of Colorado

References 

Lakes of Colorado